Naudedrillia hayesi is a species of sea snail, a marine gastropod mollusk in the family Pseudomelatomidae, the turrids and allies.

Description

Distribution
This marine species occurs off the Agulhas Bank, South Africa.

References

External links
 Kilburn R.N. 2005. New species of Drilliidae and Turridae from southern Africa (Mollusca: Gastropoda: Conoidea). African Invertebrates, 46: 85-92

Endemic fauna of South Africa
hayesi
Gastropods described in 2005